Thomas Treffry may refer to:

Thomas Treffry (died 1564), MP for Bodmin
Thomas Treffry II, MP for Bodmin in 1545